Clogh is a village, and namesake of an electoral district in County Kilkenny, Ireland. It is also a townland in the civil parish of Castlecomer in the ancient barony of Fassadinin.

Clogh is situated on the R426 road near Castlecomer.

History
In 1837 it lay along the road from Castlecomer on the road to Athy. It containing 116 houses( mostly thatched) and 582 inhabitants. Most people were employed in the neighbouring collieries. It had a constabulary police station. In 1837, the district of Clogh comprised parts of the parishes of Castlecomer and Rathaspeck. The Roman Catholic chapel for the district was in Clogh.

The village takes its name from the Irish An Chloc which means "stone" or "stone building". The original townsland name was Magleitid (Broad plain). History tells of a castle sited in the "Castle field" in the townland of Coultha; this may be where Clogh derived its name. The village is 27 km north of Kilkenny City, 16 km from Carlow town, 25 km from Portlaoise, and 20 km from Athy to the north.

Clogh is in the Electoral Division of Clogh, in the civil parish of Castlecomer, in the Barony of Fassadinin, County of Kilkenny. Clogh borders the following townlands: Aughatubbrid or Chatsworth, Cloneen, Coolnaleen, Crutt, Kill, Loon, Moneenroe, Tourtane. The Electoral Division covers an area of 0.83 square miles with a population of 1,127.

Demographics
As of the Central Statistics Office's 2006 census, Clogh's population, including Chatsworth, was 351. This was a 9.7% change since 2002. As of the 2016 census of Ireland, the population was 344.

Clogh was once a densely populated rural area, mostly due to the employment given in the coal mines around the area. Coalmining began in the 1640s by Christopher Wandesforde, the coal produced was a high grade anthracite with low sulphur content. Situated in the Leinster coal–fields which spread into counties Laois and Carlow, by the late 1800s seven or eight mines existed, and in Deerpark mines opened in the 1920s and at its peak employed 600 people. When the mines closed in 1969, it was a blow to the communities of North Kilkenny. Many coal-mining families emigrated to Heckscherville, Pennsylvania during and after the Great Famine of 1845–1851. The Payne brothers who ran the coal pits came to the area of North Kilkenny and Laois to recruit miners for their mines. They provided transportation, employment and homes to those who agreed to move. The graveyard at St. Kierans  in Heckscherville have some of these families interred.

Built heritage
The first church in Clogh was built on the site of the present church in the 13th century. This replaced the ancient church that stood at Kilpatrick. The present church was built in 1826.  The graveyard is large and contains monuments, including one to Michael Fenlon who constructed the first Boulton & Watt steam engine for use in the nearby Doonane Colliery (1793/94). Fenlon was a lecturer in Trinity College, Dublin, he died at the young age of 36 years. Moneenroe Catholic Church was built in 1928 and cost twelve thousand pounds with the local miners contributing six thousand pounds. The Colliery Church was consecrated in 1829 and serves the Church of Ireland Community in the area.

See also
 List of towns and villages in Ireland

References 

Towns and villages in County Kilkenny
Census towns in County Kilkenny
Townlands of County Kilkenny